Julio Ricardo Fierro (born February 12, 1990) is a compound archer from Mexico.

He has won numerous medals at the FITA Archery World Cup, including a bronze medal at the 2012 World Cup final, has competed at the World Archery Championships and was the 2010 regional champion. His highest world ranking is 7, achieved in 2012.

References

1990 births
Living people
Mexican male archers
21st-century Mexican people